Linda Vista Gardens are a small urban park in the town of Abergavenny, Monmouthshire Wales. Originally the garden of a private house, the gardens came into public ownership in 1957, and were later extended as a public park. Linda Vista Gardens are registered Grade II on the Register of Parks and Gardens of Special Historic Interest in Wales. A K6 telephone box at the entrance to the gardens is listed also at Grade II. The park is managed by Monmouthshire County Council.

History and description
Linda Vista House was built as a private home in 1875. Its owner, Henry Jenkins, was born in Abergavenny, and subsequently made his fortune in the construction industry in Chile. Returning to his hometown, he built his villa and laid out the gardens, which lay mainly to the south of the house. In 1957, the gardens came into public ownership. They were subsequently extended, including land at Castle Meadows, and an extensive replanting was undertaken. 

The park includes a number of specimen trees, including a Ginkgo biloba.
Parks & Gardens UK records the "exceptional quality and variety of the planting". Linda Vista Gardens are listed at Grade II on the Register of Parks and Gardens of Special Historic Interest in Wales. 

A volunteer group, the Friends of Linda Vista Gardens, exists to preserve and improve the park.

Gallery

References

External links
 Park homepage
 RCAHMW entry

Abergavenny
Parks in Monmouthshire
Registered historic parks and gardens in Monmouthshire
Grade II listed buildings in Monmouthshire